Heartstone is a historical mystery novel by British author C. J. Sansom. It is Sansom's sixth novel, and the fifth in the Matthew Shardlake Series. Set in the 16th century during the reign of King Henry VIII,  the events of the novel take place in the summer of 1545. Shardlake and his assistant Barak travel to Portsmouth on a legal case given to them by an old servant of Queen Catherine Parr.  The book also concerns preparations for the Battle of the Solent and the King's warship, the Mary Rose.

The book introduces the young Princess Elizabeth in a minor role.

An abridged audiobook on CD, narrated by Anton Lesser, was released by Macmillan Digital Audio in 2010. An unabridged audiobook, nearly 23 hours of narration performed by Steven Crossley, was released in 2011.

In 2018, BBC Radio 4 aired a full-cast adaptation of the novel, dramatised by Colin MacDonald, with Justin Salinger starring as Shardlake.

Awards and honors
2011 Walter Scott Prize, shortlist

References

2010 British novels
British crime novels
Novels by C. J. Sansom
Historical crime novels
Novels set in the 1540s
Catherine Parr
Macmillan Publishers books

it:I sette calici dell'eresia